Kim Soo-hyun (born February 16, 1988) is a South Korean actor. One of the highest-paid actors in South Korea, his accolades include four Baeksang Arts Awards, two Grand Bell Awards and one Blue Dragon Film Award. From 2012 to 2016 and in 2021, he has appeared in Forbes Korea Power Celebrity 40 list. He was selected as Gallup Korea's Television Actor of the Year in 2014 and was featured by Forbes in their 30 Under 30 Asia list of 2016.

Kim took acting classes during his school years on his mother's recommendation to overcome his introvert personality. Following a few theatrical works, he made his television debut in 2007 with the family sitcom Kimchi Cheese Smile. He went on to establish himself with starring roles in the television dramas Dream High (2011), Moon Embracing the Sun (2012), as well as in the top-grossing films The Thieves (2012) and Secretly, Greatly (2013). His performance as King Lee Hwon in Moon Embracing the Sun won him the Baeksang Arts Award for Best Actor – Television. 

Kim became a top Hallyu star as he gained further success with the fantasy romantic comedy My Love from the Star (2013–14), and the variety-drama The Producers (2015), which earned him three Daesang (Grand Prize). Following the box-office failure Real (2017), he enlisted to complete his mandatory military service. He marked his return to acting with the romantic comedy It's Okay to Not Be Okay (2020) and the thriller One Ordinary Day (2021).

Early life and education
Born on February 16, 1988, Kim's father is Kim Chung-hoon and was the lead singer of the 80's band "Seven Dolphins".

Kim's mother encouraged him to take acting classes during his school years to help him overcome his shy and introverted personality. His aspirations to be an actor really took off between his middle school and high school. His first major acting was in a stage play of Shakespeare's comedy A Midsummer Night's Dream delivering the role of Puck. His later work in the theatre includes the role of Kenickie and  Hamlet in the musical Grease and tragedy Hamlet.

By 2006, Kim completed elementary, middle and high school in Gangnam, Seoul and debuted as a TV actor in 2007 after auditions. He enrolled at Chung-Ang University's Film and Theater Department in 2009.

Career

2007–2010: Television career beginnings
Kim made his television debut with a supporting role in the 2007 family sitcom Kimchi Cheese Smile, and in 2008, landed a lead role in KBS's critically acclaimed youth drama, Jungle Fish. Based on a true story, it tackles the serious issues of school cheating, competitive academic standards, and interactive blogging in a fresh way. The drama won a number of awards, including the US Peabody Award.

For the latter half of the year, Kim appeared in the food-based variety show Delicious Quiz (also known as The Taste of Life) as one of the hosts and in the short film Cherry Blossom.

In 2009, Kim acted in the short film Worst Friends by Namkoong Sun, which won the Best Film in Social Drama award at the Mise-en-scène Short Film Festival and the well-received SBS drama special Father's House where he acted alongside veteran actor Choi Min-soo. He also co-hosted Mnet's Boys & Girls Music Countdown along with Kara's Han Seung-yeon in 2009.

In January 2010, KeyEast signed an exclusive contract with Kim becoming his management company.

Kim raised his profile through memorable turns as the younger version of the male lead characters in Will It Snow for Christmas? and Giant, the latter winning him the Best New Actor award at the SBS Drama Awards.

2011–2013: Rising popularity and breakthrough
Kim became a household name in 2011 after starring in teen musical drama Dream High. He plays a country bumpkin who turned out to be a musical genius. The drama brought in high domestic ratings and was also popular overseas, winning several international awards. As the only young actor in a cast of idols, Kim studied song and dance for three months at JYP Entertainment to pull off the required scenes in the drama. He recorded two songs for the drama's soundtrack, his solo "Dreaming" as well as the title track "Dream High" with the rest of the cast.

Kim's popularity skyrocketed when he starred in the hit period drama Moon Embracing the Sun as the King Leehwon. The drama recorded a peak rating of 42.2 percent, thereby earning the "national drama" status and was exported to locales across Asia, making it one of the most profitable exports in the drama genre. Kim contributed his vocals to the soundtrack with the traditional ballad "Only You" and the more modern composition "Another Way".

Due to his popularity, he set a new record in product endorsements for being the face of 17 products simultaneously. He also won the Best Actor (TV) award at the 48th Baeksang Arts Awards. Beating out heavyweight veterans such as Han Suk-kyu, Shin Ha-kyun and Cha Seung-won, Kim said "I am very grateful for this moment, but I am ashamed as well. It's like getting a lot of homework. I'll keep trying to become a better actor in order to remain worthy of this award".

Kim made his big-screen debut in the star-studded heist film The Thieves, touted by the press as the Korean version of Ocean's Eleven. With over 12.9 million ticket sales, the film became the second highest-grossing movie in Korean film history.

In 2013, Kim was cast to play the role of a North Korean spy who infiltrated South Korea as a village idiot in the movie Secretly, Greatly, an adaptation of the popular webtoon series Covertness by Hun. The film broke several records and was one of the most successful box office hits of the year drawing an audience of 7 million. Kim won Best New Actor (Film) awards at the 50th Grand Bell Awards and the 50th Baeksang Arts Awards.

2014–2017: International popularity
From 2013 to early 2014, Kim starred in SBS fantasy romance series My Love from the Star alongside Jun Ji-hyun. He also released two singles for the drama's soundtrack, titled "In Front of Your House" and "Promise". It became massively popular across Asia, especially in China; it had over 14.5 billion hits as of February 2014 on the online video platform iQIYI and also sparked trends in fashion, make-up and restaurants.

Kim experienced explosive growth in popularity throughout Asia topping various popularity polls and became one of the most in-demand endorsers with 35 product endorsements. He won the Daesang (or "Grand Prize"), the highest award for television, at the 7th Korea Drama Awards and Most Popular Actor (TV) at 50th Baeksang Arts Awards.

In 2015, Kim starred in KBS variety drama The Producers, written by My Love From the Star writer Park Ji-eun. The drama drew solid domestic ratings domestically, and was also sold to several countries internationally. Kim became one of the South Korea's favorite leading faces on TV according to the Korea Broadcast Advertising Corporation. Kim once again won the Daesang (or "Grand Prize") at the 8th Korea Drama Awards, 4th APAN Star Awards and the 2015 KBS Drama Awards for his acting performance.

Kim's wax figure made in his image was displayed at Madame Tussauds, Hong Kong and Musée Grévin, Seoul in 2015. In the following year, he was listed under Forbes "30 Under 30 Asia list" which comprises 30 influential people under 30 years of age who have made substantial effect in their fields.

Kim then starred in the action-noir film Real, directed by his cousin Lee Sa-rang, which premiered in June 2017. The film tanked at the box office and received negative reviews from the critics for its direction, storyline, characters' information; saying that only Kim saved the movie with his acting to some extent.

On contrast, the film received favourable response after its arrival in Taiwan's cinema.  Expat Korean Movie Critic/Blogger Pierce Conran included Real in his list of top 15 Korean Movies of 2017 for its uniqueness and originality.

Kim temporarily left his venture into acting and enlisted to complete his obligatory military service of 21 months.

2017–2019: Military enlistment and discharge

Kim began his mandatory military service on October 23, 2017. He was supposed to work in public service duty instead of active duty as he previously underwent a surgery related to his heart. However, he voluntarily went for re-examinations and was eventually cleared for the combat. He entered a military camp in Paju, Gyeonggi Province to complete his basic training.

In late November 2017, Kim's agency announced that he had completed his five weeks of basic training, placing fourth as an outstanding trainee. He was rewarded with a vacation by the division commander and received a self deployment to the 1st Reconnaissance Battalion to continue his duty.

In February 2019, Kim received an early promotion as a Sergeant for his exceptional conduct in the military. Kim was discharged from his military service on July 1, 2019.

2019–present: Comeback from military
Kim made headlines in newspapers when he stepped back into his acting career through his special appearances on dramas Hotel del Luna and Crash Landing on You.

In December 2019, reports surfaced that Kim would be leaving KeyEast to form a new agency with his cousin. In January 2020, Kim signed with newly formed entertainment agency Goldmedalist along with actresses Kim Sae-ron and Seo Yea-ji.

In 2020, Kim took on the role of Moon Gang-tae, an orphaned psychiatric aide in the tvN and Netflix broadcast romantic comedy It's Okay to Not Be Okay. The series was Kim's first small screen appearance in a lead role after a five-year gap. In comparison to his earlier dramas the series lacked lustre in terms of TV viewership ratings. However, it was the most popular show of 2020 on Netflix in South Korea in romance genre. The New York Times named It's Okay to Not Be Okay one of "The Best International Shows of 2020," while La Tercera called it "one of the most popular Asian dramas" of 2020. S. Poorvaja of The Hindu said of Kim's acting that he brought "Gang-tae alive on screen perfectly — someone whose silent world weariness slowly but steadily progressed to sparkling eyes, smiles and enthusiasm." He once again won the Daesang (or "Grand Prize") at the 5th Asia Artist Awards in the television category.

In 2021, Kim starred in Coupang Play's television series One Ordinary Day, based on the British television series Criminal Justice, played the role of Kim Hyun-soo, a normal college student whose life turns upside down when he unexpectedly becomes the key suspect of the murder case.

On December 21, 2021, Gold Medalist announced that it will produce and promote actor Kim Soo-hyun's digital human together with EVR Studio. That has an appearance like a real person and can use facial expressions and plans to be used in a variety of industries including entertainment, metaverse, movies, and advertising in the future.

On December 5, 2022, Studio Dragon confirmed Kim's participation in the upcoming drama Queen of Tears (tentative title) slated in the second half of 2023. Kim will act as Baek Hyun-woo, the legal director of the Queens Group.

Other activities

Event appearances

In 2014, Kim attended two international sports events. Held on August 16, 2014, Kim sang the official theme song "Light up the Future" with several artists at the opening ceremony of the 2014 Summer Youth Olympic Games held in Nanjing, China. He also participated in the opening ceremony of the 2014 Asian Games in Incheon, South Korea. Along with  actor Jang Dong-gun, Korean opera singer Ahn Sook-sun and people from 45 nations, they delivered the message of "One Asia" at the second part of the highlight stage.

Ambassadorship

In 2011, Kim along with Bae Suzy were the Ambassadors of the 16th Korea Goyang International Flower Festival. On 18 April 2012, Korea Tourism Organization appointed Kim as the Honorary Ambassador for Korean tourism. On 3 December 2012, Kim was appointed as the Public Relation Ambassador for Lotte Hotel Busan. On 20 May 2014, Kim was appointed as one of the Public Relations Ambassador for his alma mater, Chung-Ang University. On 25 October 2015, Kim was appointed as the Goodwill Ambassador of Seoul. For the city's promotion, he participated in various cultural events in the next two years. In 2015, Kim was the Honorary Ambassador for the Incheon International Airport. In 2016, Kim is the Promotional Ambassador for Paradise City.

Philanthropy
Since, 2012, Kim and his fans have donated a total of 20 tons of rice every year to help those in need.

In April 2014, during his tour of Asia Kim donated about ₩200 million to the China Children & Teenager's Fund from a Gucci charity event. He also joined Yellow Ribbon Campaign, and donated ₩300 million to help the teenage victims of Sewol ferry tragedy.

In January 2017, Kim along with 32 top stars of South Korea joined an online fund raising event, Give Love, to help NGOs dedicated to protecting children's rights.

In February 2020, Kim delivered ₩100 million in donations to support low income families affected by COVID-19 pandemic.

Endorsements
Kim has been regarded as the 'King of product endorsements' by media outlets; and has been the face of variety of products ranging from food, clothing, electronics, telecoms to automobiles and more. He started emerging as a blue chip in the advertising industry soon after he grabbed viewer's attention through his acting in Giant. But when he starred in Moon Embracing the Sun, he set the record of being the face of 17 products simultaneously overtaking figure skater Yuna Kim, who had set the record back in 2009 by amassing 15 endorsements. Kim became most in-demand advertising model after his drama My Love From the Star with appearing in more than 30 advertisements, including 10 airing in China and other Asian counties. He has also been the face of Jeju airlines and main character of a Chinese video game.

In 2014, Kim Soo-hyun appeared in an ad alongside Gianna Jun for Chinese bottled water company Hengda bingquan. The move drew negative reactions from South Korean fans due to Hengda listing the source of its water as "Jang bai shan" (Changbai Mountain) rather than the Korean name, "Mount Baekdusan." Both actors sought to revoke their ad contracts after the backlash but Kim eventually decided to continue with the ad, which disappointed many of his fans.

In 2015, Kim along with Yuna Kim won grand prizes at the National Brand Awards for improving Korea's brand image.

Kim joined the Philippine retail brand Bench as a product endorser in July 2021.

On September 13, 2021, Kim was selected as a global ambassador for Tommy Hilfiger.

In 2022, Dunkin' Donuts revealed that Kim is their newest product endorser.

Personal life
In March 2015, Kim was awarded for being a model taxpayer by the local tax office for faithfully paying taxes every Tax Day.

In July 2015, it was revealed that Kim has a paternal half-sister named Kim Ju-na, a singer.

Bowling
A bowling enthusiast, Kim applied to become a professional bowler in October 2016. He ranked 10th out of the 114 participants on his first try-out tournament but failed to make the cut on the second, falling short of the 200 points needed to qualify with only 192.3. Kim showcased his bowling skills on his guest appearance on MBC's Infinite Challenge.

Filmography

Discography

Awards and nominations

Footnotes

References

External links

  at Gold Medalist 

South Korean male film actors
South Korean male musical theatre actors
South Korean male television actors
South Korean television presenters
Chung-Ang University alumni
South Korean Roman Catholics
Living people
People from Seoul
Male actors from Seoul
1988 births
21st-century South Korean male actors
South Korean bowling players
Best New Actor Paeksang Arts Award (film) winners